Patrick Serret (born 2 August 1960) is an Australian former professional tennis player.

Born in Nice, France, Serret moved to Australia at a young age and was a student at Canterbury Boys' High School.

Serret was the boys' singles champion at the 1978 Australian Open, beating Chris Johnstone in the final.

From 1981 to 1984, Serret played collegiate tennis for the University of Arkansas, earning All-American honours in each of his four seasons. Partnering Australian teammate Peter Doohan, Serret won the 1982 NCAA Division I doubles championship. The pair also competed together in the men's doubles main draw of the 1982 US Open.

Serret is married with two daughters and lives in the U.S. state of Louisiana.

References

External links
 
 

1960 births
Living people
Australian male tennis players
Australian Open (tennis) junior champions
Grand Slam (tennis) champions in boys' singles
Arkansas Razorbacks men's tennis players
Tennis players from Sydney
Sportspeople from Nice
French emigrants to Australia
Australian emigrants to the United States